Eostrobilops nipponica is a species of air-breathing land snail, terrestrial pulmonate gastropod mollusks in the family Strobilopsidae.

Subspecies 
 Eostrobilops nipponica nipponica Pilsbry, 1927 - It is a vulnerable subspecies.
 Eostrobilops nipponica reikoae Matsumura & Minato, 1998 - This is a near threatened subspecies.

Distribution 
This species occurs in Japan.

References

External links 

Strobilopsidae
Gastropods described in 1927